Feelin' Kinda Blues is an album by the Gerald Wilson Orchestra recorded in 1965 and released on the Pacific Jazz label.

Reception

AllMusic rated the album with 4 stars; in his review, Scott Yanow said: "Surprisingly Wilson did not contribute any of the ten songs but his arrangements make all of the pieces sound fresh and swinging".

Track listing 
 "When I'm Feeling Kinda Blue" (Gerald Wilson) - 3:40
 "Freddie Freeloader" (Miles Davis) - 4:12
 "Do Anything You Wanna" (Harold Betters, Carl Ramsey) - 2:21
 "Yesterday" (John Lennon, Paul McCartney) - 2:22
 "Watermelon Man" (Herbie Hancock) - 4:33
 "Yeh Yeh" (Rodgers Grant, Pat Patrick, Jon Hendricks) - 2:35
 "One On the House" (Harry James, Ernie Wilkins) - 4:36
 "I Got You (I Feel Good)" (James Brown) - 2:46
 "I Concentrate on You" (Cole Porter) - 4:58
 "Well Son Shuffle" (Mike Barone) - 2:53
Recorded at United Recorders in Los Angeles, CA on November 30, 1965 (tracks 4, 8 & 9) and December 2, 1965 (tracks 1-3 & 5-7)

Personnel 
Gerald Wilson - arranger, conductor
Bobby Bryant, Jules Chaikin, Freddie Hill, Nat Meeks, Melvin Moore, Al Porcino  - trumpet
Bob Edmondson, John Ewing, Lester Robertson - trombone
Fred Murell - bass trombone
Curtis Amy - soprano saxophone
Anthony Ortega - alto saxophone, flute, piccolo
Teddy Edwards, Harold Land - tenor saxophone
Jack Nimitz - baritone saxophone
Phil Moore III - piano
Don Randi - organ
Dennis Budimir - guitar
Buddy Woodson - bass
Victor Feldman - vibraphone
Mel Lee - drums
Modesto Duran, Bones Howe, Adolfo Valdes - percussion

References 

Gerald Wilson albums
1965 albums
Pacific Jazz Records albums
Albums arranged by Gerald Wilson
Albums conducted by Gerald Wilson